Elizabeth Francesca Prettejohn (born 15 May 1961) is an art historian and author of several books about art history. Her books have included Rossetti and his Circle (1997), The Art of the Pre-Raphaelites (2000) and Art for Art's Sake (2007). She has also co-edited and co-authored several publications. She has written exhibition catalogues and papers for journals such as The Burlington Magazine, Journal of Victorian Culture and Art Bulletin.

Education and career

Prettejohn was the Professor of the history of art at the University of Bristol from 2005, before becoming head of the history of art at the University of York in 2012. She had also been the Professor of Modern Art at the University of Plymouth and (briefly) the curator of Paintings and Sculpture at Birmingham Museum and Art Gallery. She studied at Harvard University, where she got her Bachelor of Arts degree (summa cum laude), and at the Courtauld Institute of Art, where she got her Master of Arts degree in 1987 and PhD degree in 1991. She is married to the Professor of Classics and Dean of Arts, Charles Martindale.

Publications

Books

Curated exhibitions

References

 Lawrence Alma-Tadema and the Modern City of Ancient Rome
 Art for Art's Sake

External links
 Elizabeth Prettejohn, University of York

American art historians
Harvard University alumni
Academics of the University of Plymouth
Academics of the University of Bristol
Living people
Alumni of the Courtauld Institute of Art
Women art historians
1961 births
20th-century American women writers
21st-century American women writers
Academics of the University of York
American women historians
American women curators
American curators